Edwards Lifesciences is an American medical technology company headquartered in Irvine, California, specializing in artificial heart valves and hemodynamic monitoring. It developed the SAPIEN transcatheter aortic heart valve made of cow tissue within a balloon-expandable, cobalt-chromium frame, deployed via catheter. The company has manufacturing facilities at the Irvine headquarters, as well as in Draper, Utah; Costa Rica; the Dominican Republic; Puerto Rico; and Singapore; and is building a new facility due to be completed in 2021 in Limerick, Ireland.

History
Edwards was originally founded by engineer Miles “Lowell” Edwards in 1958. Edwards and Dr. Albert Starr, a surgeon at the University of Oregon Medical School, designed, developed, tested and successfully placed in a patient the first Starr-Edwards mitral valve in 1960. As a result of the successful heart surgery, Edwards Laboratories was founded in Santa Ana, California that same year.

Edwards was acquired by Baxter in 1985. It was spun off from Baxter in 2000.

On January 25, 2017, Edwards completed the acquisition of Valtech Cardio for $340 million. The deal had been first announced the previous November.

On December 6, 2017, Edwards acquired Harpoon Medical of Baltimore, Maryland for $100 million. Harpoon, founded in 2013, developed a minimally invasive heart surgery product for mitral valve repair to treat degenerative mitral regurgitation. At the time of the acquisition, the product was not available on any market.

On April 18, 2019, Edwards completed the acquisition of CAS Medical Systems of Branford, Connecticut for ~$100 million.

Edwards SAPIEN 3 and SAPIEN 3 Ultra Transcatheter Heart Valve systems were FDA-approved for the treatment of patients at low risk for death or major complications associated with open-heart surgery on August 16, 2019. These products are used to treat patients with severe aortic stenosis without utilizing open-heart surgery.

On September 29, 2020, Edwards co-sponsored the Virtual ISPOR-FDA Summit centred on patient preference information in medical device regulatory decisions.

Business segments
Its products are categorized into four areas: Surgical Valve Technologies, Transcatheter Heart Valves (THV), Transcatheter Mitral and Tricuspid Therapies (TMTT), and Critical Care.

Surgical Valve Technologies
The portfolio also includes a diverse line of cardiac surgery systems used during minimally invasive surgical procedures, as well as cannulae and other products used during cardiopulmonary bypass.

Transcatheter Heart Valve (THV)
Edwards introduced the transcatheter heart valve (THV) replacement procedure to U.S. patients unable to undergo open-heart surgery with FDA approval of the SAPIEN transcatheter valve in 2011. The indication was expanded in November 2012 to include patients at a high risk for death or serious complications associated with open-heart surgery.

Transcatheter Mitral and Tricuspid Therapies (TMTT)
The Transcatheter Mitral and Tricuspid Therapies business segment involves the research and development of transcatheter heart valve repair and replacement technologies designed to treat mitral and tricuspid valve diseases. Many of these technologies are in early development and clinical phases, with seven programs and four clinical trials.

Critical Care
The Critical Care business segment includes pulmonary artery catheters, disposable pressure transducers and advanced hemodynamic monitoring systems. The portfolio also includes a line of balloon catheter-based vascular products, surgical clips and inserts.

COVID-19
An analysis powered by the CardioCare program (a part of Edwards Healthcare Solutions) shows 49.9% decline in echocardiography exams, which may lead to underdiagnosis of severe aortic stenosis.

Organizational culture

Edwards Lifesciences Foundation
The Edwards Lifesciences Foundation launched in 2014 and supports programs designed to treat underserved people to reduce heart valve disease.

The “Every Heartbeat Matters” (EHM) initiative has educated, screened and treated 1.7 million underserved people, exceeding its goal of serving 1 million underserved patients.

References

External links 
 

Medical technology companies of the United States
Companies listed on the New York Stock Exchange
Life sciences industry
Health care companies based in California
Technology companies based in Greater Los Angeles
Manufacturing companies based in California
Technology companies established in 1958
Manufacturing companies established in 1958
1958 establishments in California